Michel Lefait (born May 20, 1946) is a member of the National Assembly of France.  He represents the Pas-de-Calais department,  and is a member of the Socialiste, radical, citoyen et divers gauche.

References

1946 births
Living people
Socialist Party (France) politicians
Deputies of the 12th National Assembly of the French Fifth Republic
Deputies of the 13th National Assembly of the French Fifth Republic
Deputies of the 14th National Assembly of the French Fifth Republic